George Hecht may refer to:
 George Hecht (American football), American football player
 George J. Hecht, founder and publisher of Parents magazine and owner of FAO Schwarz